West DeLand is a census-designated place (CDP) in Volusia County, Florida, United States. The population was 3,908 at the 2020 census.

Geography
West DeLand is located at  (29.018654, -81.328754).

Demographics

As of the census of 2000, there were 3,424 people, 1,283 households, and 934 families residing in the CDP.  The population density was 565.0/km (1,465.0/mi2).  There were 1,342 housing units at an average density of 221.4/km (574.2/mi2).  The racial makeup of the CDP was 88.70% White, 6.57% African American, 0.20% Native American, 0.55% Asian, 2.63% from other races, and 1.34% from two or more races. Hispanic or Latino of any race were 6.45% of the population.

There were 1,283 households, out of which 32.4% had children under the age of 18 living with them, 55.1% were married couples living together, 12.5% had a female householder with no husband present, and 27.2% were non-families. 22.0% of all households were made up of individuals, and 10.1% had someone living alone who was 65 years of age or older.  The average household size was 2.65 and the average family size was 3.05.

In the CDP, the population was spread out, with 25.3% under the age of 18, 7.4% from 18 to 24, 28.0% from 25 to 44, 24.4% from 45 to 64, and 14.9% who were 65 years of age or older.  The median age was 38 years. For every 100 females, there were 97.9 males.  For every 100 females age 18 and over, there were 93.0 males.

The median income for a household in the CDP was $36,832, and the median income for a family was $40,560. Males had a median income of $29,145 versus $21,902 for females. The per capita income for the CDP was $19,496.  About 4.8% of families and 9.4% of the population were below the poverty line, including 13.0% of those under age 18 and 9.5% of those age 65 or over.

References

Census-designated places in Volusia County, Florida
Census-designated places in Florida
Populated places on the St. Johns River